Massasoit is a statue by the American sculptor Cyrus Edwin Dallin in Plymouth, Massachusetts. It was completed in 1921 to mark the three hundredth anniversary of the Pilgrims' landing. The sculpture is meant to represent the Pokanoket leader Massasoit welcoming the Pilgrims on the occasion of the first Thanksgiving. Several replicas of the statue exist across the United States, including numerous small-scale souvenir reproductions.

References 

1921 sculptures
Statues in Massachusetts
Buildings and structures in Plymouth, Massachusetts
Sculptures of men in Massachusetts
Monuments and memorials to the Pilgrims
Sculptures of Native Americans
Works by Cyrus Edwin Dallin
1921 establishments in Massachusetts